Events from the year 1988 in Canada.

Incumbents

Crown 
 Monarch – Elizabeth II

Federal government 
 Governor General – Jeanne Sauvé
 Prime Minister – Brian Mulroney
 Chief Justice – Brian Dickson (Manitoba)
 Parliament – 33rd (until 1 October) then 34th (from December 12)

Provincial governments

Lieutenant governors 
Lieutenant Governor of Alberta – Helen Hunley   
Lieutenant Governor of British Columbia – Robert G. Rogers (until September 9) then David Lam
Lieutenant Governor of Manitoba – George Johnson 
Lieutenant Governor of New Brunswick – Gilbert Finn 
Lieutenant Governor of Newfoundland – James McGrath 
Lieutenant Governor of Nova Scotia – Alan Abraham 
Lieutenant Governor of Ontario – Lincoln Alexander 
Lieutenant Governor of Prince Edward Island – Lloyd MacPhail 
Lieutenant Governor of Quebec – Gilles Lamontagne 
Lieutenant Governor of Saskatchewan – Frederick Johnson (until September 7) then Sylvia Fedoruk

Premiers 
Premier of Alberta – Don Getty  
Premier of British Columbia – Bill Vander Zalm 
Premier of Manitoba – Howard Pawley (until May 9) then Gary Filmon 
Premier of New Brunswick – Frank McKenna 
Premier of Newfoundland – Brian Peckford 
Premier of Nova Scotia – John Buchanan 
Premier of Ontario – David Peterson 
Premier of Prince Edward Island – Joe Ghiz 
Premier of Quebec – Robert Bourassa 
Premier of Saskatchewan – Grant Devine

Territorial governments

Commissioners 
 Commissioner of Yukon –  John Kenneth McKinnon 
 Commissioner of Northwest Territories – John Havelock Parker

Premiers 
Premier of the Northwest Territories – Dennis Patterson
Premier of Yukon – Tony Penikett

Events
January 28 – Canada's abortion laws are repealed by the Supreme Court.
March 19 – Jacques Parizeau becomes leader of the Parti Québécois.
May – , the first , is launched in Saint John, New Brunswick.
May 9 – Gary Filmon becomes premier of Manitoba, replacing Howard Pawley.
June 4 – The Canadian Heraldic Authority is established, with a mandate to grant armorial bearings to worthy Canadians and Canadian corporations. It is the first heraldic authority in the Commonwealth of Nations outside the United Kingdom.
July 21 – The War Measures Act is replaced by the Emergencies Act.
September 1 – Several new cable channels sign-on: YTV, VisionTV, Family, WeatherNow, MétéoMédia, TV5 Québec Canada.
September 1 – All rail service is terminated in Newfoundland after CN Rail abandons its rail lines on the island operated by its Terra Transport subsidiary.
September 22 – Prime Minister Brian Mulroney officially apologizes for the World War II internment of Japanese Canadians.
November 1 – The Canadian Centre on Substance Abuse is created.
November 21 – In the federal election, Brian Mulroney's Progressive Conservative Party wins a second majority government in an election fought over the Canada-US Free Trade Agreement.
December 15 – The Supreme Court rules that Quebec's Charter of the French Language is unconstitutional.
December 21 – The Quebec government reinstates the language laws using the notwithstanding clause.

Full date unknown
Svend Robinson becomes Canada's first Member of Parliament to come out as homosexual.
Maher Arar emigrates to Canada.
David Lam becomes Lieutenant-Governor of British Columbia.
CHUM Limited buys the CHUM-City Building at the corner of Queen and John streets in Toronto as their headquarters.
Conrad Black gains control of The Spectator.

Arts and literature
May 21 – The new National Gallery of Canada building opens in Ottawa.

New works
Timothy Findley – Stones
Morley Callaghan – A Wild Old Man on the Road
Jeffrey Simpson – Spoils of Power
bill bissett – What We Have

Awards
See 1988 Governor General's Awards for a complete list of winners and finalists for those awards.
Books in Canada First Novel Award: Marion Quednau, The Butterfly Chair
Geoffrey Bilson Award: 1988 – Carol Matas, 'Lisa
Gerald Lampert Award: Di Brandt, Questions I Asked My Mother
Marian Engel Award: Edna Alford
Pat Lowther Award: Gwendolyn MacEwen, Afterworlds
Stephen Leacock Award: Paul Quarrington, King Leary
Trillium Book Award: Timothy Findley, Stones
Vicky Metcalf Award: Barbara Smucker

Sport
February 13–February 28 – The XV Olympic Winter Games are held in Calgary.
May 14 – The Medicine Hat Tigers win their second (consecutive) Memorial Cup by defeating the Windsor Spitfires 7 to 6. The final game was played at Centre Georges-Vézina in Chicoutimi, Quebec
May 26 – The Edmonton Oilers win their fourth (second consecutive) Stanley Cup by defeating the Boston Bruins 4 games to 0. Brantford, Ontario's Wayne Gretzky was awarded his second Conn Smythe Trophy
July – The 1988 World Junior Championships in Athletics take place in Sudbury, Ontario.
August 9 – Wayne Gretzky is traded to the Los Angeles Kings by the Edmonton Oilers with Mike Krushelnyski and Marty McSorley for Jimmy Carson, Martin Gélinas,  and the Kings' first-round draft picks in 1989 (later acquired by New Jersey Devils, who selected Jason Miller), 1991 (Martin Ručínský), and 1993 (Nick Stajduhar)
September 26 – Sprinter Ben Johnson is stripped of his Olympic gold medal and world record when he tests positive for steroids.
Figure skater Kurt Browning completes the first-ever quadruple toe loop in competition.
November 19 – The Calgary Dinos win their third Vanier Cup by defeating the Saint Mary's Huskies by a score of 52–23 in the 24th Vanier Cup
November 27 – The Winnipeg Blue Bombers win their ninth Grey Cup by defeating the BC Lions in the 76th Grey Cup played at Lansdowne Park in Ottawa. Ancaster, Ontario's Bob Cameron was awarded the game's Most Valuable Canadian

Births
January 6 – Andrew Robinson, water polo player
January 19 – Tyler Breeze, pro wrestler
February 14 – Katie Boland, actress, writer, and producer
February 20 – Tracy Spiridakos, actress
February 27 – Dustin Jeffrey, ice hockey player
March 15 – James Reimer, ice hockey goaltender
March 16 – Jessica Gregg, speed skater
April 21 – Robbie Amell, actor
April 29 – Jonathan Toews, hockey player
May 3 – Kaya Turski, freestyle skier
May 5 – Skye Sweetnam, singer-songwriter and actress
May 9 – J. R. Fitzpatrick, race car driver
May 16 – Amanda Asay, baseball and ice hockey player (died 2022)
May 18 – Ryan Cooley, actor
May 26 – Kelly MacDonald, diver
June 6 – Keshia Chanté, singer-songwriter, model, actress, and philanthropist
June 7 – Michael Cera, actor
June 12 – Dakota Morton, actor and radio host
June 16 – Keshia Chanté, singer-songwriter, model and actress
June 18 – Yannick Riendeau, ice hockey player
July 2 – Seanna Mitchell, swimmer
July 6 – Mathieu Bois, swimmer
July 12 – Melissa O'Neil, singer
July 25 – Heather Marks, model
July 29 – Emily Csikos, water polo player
August 4 – Carly Foulkes, model and actress
August 8 – Jake Goldsbie, actor
August 16 – Tara Teng, model, activist, and television presenter
August 23 - Alice Glass, singer
August 28 - Rosie MacLennan, trampoline gymnast
September 10 – Jordan Staal, hockey player
September 24 – Kirsten Sweetland, triathlete
September 26 – Lilly Singh, YouTuber, comedian and TV host
October 17 – Cristine Rotenberg, crime statistics analyst and YouTube personality
October 21 – Mark Rendall, actor
November 3 – Jessie Loutit, rower
November 8 – Jessica Lowndes, actress and singer-songwriter
November 16 – Kier Maitland, swimmer
November 21 – Len Väljas, cross-country skier
November 22 – Reece Thompson, actor
December 16 – Gael Mackie, artistic gymnast

Full date unknown
Anastasia De Sousa, student (died 2006)

Deaths

January to June
February 2 – Louis-Marie Régis, philosopher, theologian, scholar and member of the Dominican Order (born 1903)
March 20 – Gil Evans, jazz pianist, arranger, composer and bandleader (born 1912)
June 19 – Fernand Seguin, biochemist, professor and television host (born 1922)

July to December
July 4 
 Donald MacLaren, World War I flying ace, businessman (born 1893)
 Dave McKigney, professional wrestler (born 1932)
July 9 – Richard Spink Bowles, lawyer and Lieutenant Governor of Manitoba (born 1912)
August 8 – Félix Leclerc, folk singer, poet, writer, actor and political activist (born 1914)
August 28 – Jean Marchand, trade unionist and politician (born 1918)
September 8 – Joseph Algernon Pearce, astrophysicist (born 1893)
September 25 – bpNichol, poet (born 1944)
September 27 – George Grant, philosopher, teacher and political commentator (born 1918)
October 15 – Victor Copps, politician and Mayor of Hamilton (born 1919)
October 31 – Alfred Pellan, painter (born 1906)
November 26 – John Dahmer, politician (born 1937)
December 20 — Alphonse Ouimet, president of CBC from 1958 to 1968 (born 1908)

See also
 1988 in Canadian television
 List of Canadian films of 1988

References

 
Years of the 20th century in Canada
Canada
1988 in North America